The Octopus is the third studio album of the Manchester space rock band Amplifier. The format of the album is double CD. It was released to fans online in December 2010 and was commercially released in January 2011. In reviewing the album, the BBC stated that it was "an album that commands respects and time to be afforded to it, but the rewards are plentiful. If two discs seem slightly overwhelming at first, then the other perspective is that there is so much quality to digest here that your value for money is not even in question." The album can be listened to online at a mini-site set up by the band. The Octopus vinyl edition was released in October 2019 with "The Eternal" as an exclusive bonus track.

Track listing

CD 1

CD 2

Credits
Sel Balamir – guitar, vocals, production and Mixing
Neil Mahony – bass 
Matt Brobin – drums
Charlie Barnes - piano
Mike Vennart - guest vocals
Jon Astley - mastering

References

External links
Band's official site
Full album streaming
Octopus website

Amplifier (band) albums
2011 albums